Professional privilege may refer to rights to maintain confidentiality in various professions and jurisdictions:

 Accountant–client privilege in the United States
 Legal professional privilege:
 Legal professional privilege (Common Law)
 Legal professional privilege (Australia)
 Legal professional privilege (England & Wales)
 Attorney–client privilege (United States)
 Physician–patient privilege

See also 
 Priest–penitent privilege